In July 2015, a group calling itself "The Impact Team" stole the user data of Ashley Madison, a commercial website billed as enabling extramarital affairs. The group copied personal information about the site's user base and threatened to release users' names and personally identifying information if Ashley Madison would not immediately shut down. On 18 and 20 August, the group leaked more than 60 gigabytes of company data, including user details.

Because of the site's policy of not deleting users' personal information – including real names, home addresses, search history and credit card transaction records – many users feared being publicly shamed.

Timeline
The Impact Team announced the attack on 19 July 2015 and threatened to expose the identities of Ashley Madison's users if its parent company, Avid Life Media, did not shut down Ashley Madison and its sister site, "Established Men".

On 20 July 2015, the website put up three statements under its "Media" section addressing the breach. The website's normally busy Twitter account fell silent apart from posting the press statements. One statement read:

The site also offered to waive the account deletion charge.

Although Ashley Madison denied reports that a mass release of customer records occurred on 21 July, over 60 gigabytes worth of data was confirmed to be valid on 18 August. The information was released on BitTorrent in the form of a 10 gigabyte compressed archive and the link to it was posted on a dark web site only accessible via the anonymity network Tor. The data was cryptographically signed with a PGP key. In its message, the group blamed Avid Life Media, accusing the company of deceptive practices: "We have explained the fraud, deceit, and stupidity of ALM and their members. Now everyone gets to see their data ... Too bad for ALM, you promised secrecy but didn't deliver."

In response, Avid Life Media released a statement that the company was working with authorities to investigate, and said the hackers were not "hacktivists" but criminals. A second, larger, data dump occurred on 20 August 2015, the largest file of which comprised 12.7 gigabytes of corporate emails, including those of Noel Biderman, the CEO of Avid Life Media.

In July 2017, Avid Life Media (renamed Ruby Corporation) agreed to settle two dozen lawsuits stemming from the breach for $11.2 million.

Impact and ethics
None of the accounts on the website need email verification for the profile to be created, meaning that people often create profiles with fake email addresses. Ashley Madison's company required the owner of the email account to pay money to delete the profile, preventing people who had accounts set up without their consent (as a prank or mistyped email) from deleting them without paying. Hackers allege that Avid Life Media received $1.7 million a year from people paying to shut down user profiles created on the site. The company falsely asserted that paying them would "fully delete" the profiles, which the hack proved was untrue.

Josh Duggar was one notable user of Ashley Madison whose data was breached.

Following the hack, communities of internet vigilantes began combing through to find famous individuals, whom they planned to publicly humiliate. France24 reported that 1,200 Saudi Arabian '.sa' email addresses were in the leaked database, which were further extortionable due to the fact that adultery is punishable via death in Saudi Arabia. Several thousand U.S. .mil and .gov email addresses were registered on the site. In the days following the breach, extortionists began targeting people whose details were included in the leak, attempting to scam over US$200 worth of Bitcoins from them. One company started offering a "search engine" where people could type email addresses of colleagues or their spouse into the website, and if the email address was on the database leak, then the company would send them letters threatening that their details were to be exposed unless they paid money to the company.

A variety of security researchers and internet privacy activists debated the media ethics of journalists reporting on the specifics of the data, such as the names of users revealed to be members. A number of commentators compared the hack to the loss of privacy during the 2014 celebrity photo hack.

Clinical psychologists argued that dealing with an affair in a particularly public way increases the hurt for spouses and children. Carolyn Gregoire argued that "Social media has created an aggressive culture of public shaming in which individuals take it upon themselves to inflict psychological damage" and that more often than not, "the punishment goes beyond the scope of the crime." Graham Cluley argued that the psychological consequences for people shamed could be immense, and that it would be possible for some to be bullied into suicide. Charles J. Orlando, who had joined the site to conduct research on women who cheat, wrote of his concern for the spouses and children of outed cheaters, saying that "the mob that is the Internet is more than willing to serve as judge, jury, and executioner" and that site members did not deserve "a flogging in the virtual town square with millions of onlookers".

On 24 August 2015, Toronto police announced that two unconfirmed suicides had been linked to the data breach, in addition to "reports of hate crimes connected to the hack." Unconfirmed reports say a man in the U.S. died by suicide. At least one suicide, which was previously linked to Ashley Madison, has since been reported as being due to "stress entirely related to issues at work that had no connection to the data leak".

On 24 August 2015, a pastor and professor at the New Orleans Baptist Theological Seminary killed himself citing the leak that had occurred six days before.

Users whose details were leaked are filing a $567 million class-action lawsuit against Avid Dating Life and Avid Media, the owners of Ashley Madison,
through Canadian law firms Charney Lawyers and Sutts, Strosberg LLP. In July 2017, the owner of Ruby Corp. announced the company would settle the lawsuit for $11.2 million. In a 2019 interview, Ashley Madison's chief strategy officer Paul Keable confirmed the installment of security features like two-factor verification, PCI compliance and fully-encrypted browsing as a consequence of the hacker attack from 2015.

Data analysis
Annalee Newitz, editor-in-chief of Gizmodo, analyzed the leaked data. They initially found that only roughly 12,000 of the 5.5 million registered female accounts were used on a regular basis, equal to 3 in every 1000, or less than 1%. The remaining were used only one time, the day they were registered. Newitz also found that a very high number of the women's accounts were created from the same IP address, suggesting there were many fake accounts. They found women checked email messages very infrequently: for every 1 time a woman checked her email, 13,585 men checked theirs. Only 9,700 of the 5 million female account had ever replied to a message, compared to the 5.9 million men who would do the same. They concluded that, "The women's accounts show so little activity that they might as well not be there". In a subsequent article the following week Newitz acknowledged that they had "misunderstood the evidence" in their previous article, and that their conclusion that there were few females active on the site had actually been based on data recording "bot" activities in contacting members. They note that "we have absolutely no data recording human activity at all in the Ashley Madison database dump from Impact Team. All we can see is when fake humans contacted real ones."

Passwords on the live site were hashed using the bcrypt algorithm. A security analyst using the Hashcat password recovery tool with a dictionary based on the RockYou passwords found that among the 4,000 passwords that were the easiest to crack, "123456" and "password" were the most commonly used passwords on the live website. An analysis of old passwords used on an archived version showed that "123456" and "password" were the most commonly used passwords. Due to a design error where passwords were hashed with both bcrypt and MD5, 11 million passwords were eventually cracked.

Claire Brownell suggested that the Turing test could possibly be passed by the women-imitating chatbots that fooled millions of men into buying special accounts.

See also
 Internet vigilantism
 Online shaming

References

2015 in Canada
Cyberattacks
Data breaches
Hacking in the 2010s
July 2015 events
Email hacking

fr:Ashley Madison#Piratage et fuite de données